Colchicum lingulatum  is a species of flowering plant in the Colchicaceae family. It is native to north-western Turkey and to Greece.

Colchicum lingulatum blooms in early fall, with 3–4 cm (1" to 1.5") flowers of pink with widely spaced petals.  The stamens are a prominent yellow. The foliage is produced after the flowers.

Subspecies
Two subspecies are recognized:

Colchicum lingulatum subsp. lingulatum  - Greece and Turkey
Colchicum lingulatum subsp. rigescens K.Perss. - Turkey

References

lingulatum
Plants described in 1844
Flora of Greece
Flora of Turkey
Garden plants
Taxa named by Pierre Edmond Boissier